Paul S. Cremer (born 1967) is an American chemist in physical and analytical chemistry at biological interfaces.

Education and academic career

Cremer graduated from University of Wisconsin-Madison with a BA in 1990, completed his PhD at University of California, Berkeley in 1996, and completed postdoctoral work at Stanford University (1996-1998).

Paul Cremer joined the faculty in the Chemistry Department, Texas A&M University in 1998. 
He is known for his work in Hofmeister series and supported lipid bilayers.  He is also interested in nanofabrication, sum-frequency generation and biosensing.

Paul Cremer joined the faculty in the Chemistry Department, Penn State University in 2013. He continues his research in the lipid bilayer and protein folding.

References

External links
 Cremer lab website
 Google Scholar Profile

American chemists
Analytical chemistry
University of Wisconsin–Madison alumni
Living people
University of California, Berkeley alumni
Stanford University alumni
Pennsylvania State University faculty
1967 births